"Double" is BoA's 10th Japanese single and 1st Korean single. She won at MTV Video Music Awards Japan for best dance video with the music video of this song. It was a number two hit in Japan.

Track listing

Japanese version
 Double
 Midnight Parade
 Milky Way: Kimi no Uta
 Double (Instrumental)
 Midnight Parade (Instrumental)
 Milky Way: Kimi no Uta (Instrumental)

Korean version
 Double
 Always (이별풍경)
 Milky Way (Club Remix)
 Double (Instrumental)
 Always (이별풍경) (Instrumental)

Release history

Charts
Oricon Chart (Japan)

References 

BoA songs
2003 singles
2003 songs
Avex Trax singles
Torch songs
Dance-pop songs